Michał Żyro (born 20 September 1992) is a Polish professional footballer who plays as a forward for Polish I liga side Wisła Kraków. Żyro has previously played for Legia Warsaw, Korona Kielce, Pogoń Szczecin, Stal Mielec, Piast Gliwice and Jagiellonia Białystok in Poland, as well as Wolverhampton Wanderers and Charlton Athletic in England.

Club career
Żyro spent five years playing in KS Piaseczno as a youth team player before joining the youth academy at Legia Warsaw at the age of 13. When he was 17, Żyro was promoted to the senior team and ultimately the first team squad. He spent six years in the senior team scoring 13 goals in 96 matches.

On 24 December, he signed a three-and-a-half year contract with Wolverhampton Wanderers for an undisclosed fee. He joined the club officially when the transfer window re-opened on 2 January.

He made his debut for Wolverhampton Wanderers on 9 January 2016 in an FA Cup tie against West Ham United. On 12 January 2016, he scored his first goals for the club on his home and league debut, scoring twice in a 3–2 win against Fulham. Żyro scored his third goal for Wolves in a 1–3 loss against Cardiff City, shortly afterwards, he suffered a calf injury, putting him out of the game for up to six weeks. On 6 April, shortly after returning from injury, Żyro was on the receiving end of a reckless challenge from Milton Keynes Dons defender Antony Kay, causing multiple ligament damage and a fracture in his knee, ruling him out for up to 16 months. He finally made his return to competitive football almost 17 months later, on 23 August 2017 as a substitute in a 2–0 away win against Southampton in the EFL Cup.

On 22 January 2018 he joined Charlton Athletic on loan. On 31 August 2018 he joined Pogoń Szczecin on loan.

Żyro joined Korona Kielce on 28 June 2019 on a 1-year contract.

Career statistics

Club

Personal life 
His younger brother Mateusz (born in 1998) is also a professional football player.

References

External links
 
 
 Official Wolves profile

1992 births
Footballers from Warsaw
Living people
Polish footballers
Association football midfielders
Poland youth international footballers
Poland under-21 international footballers
Poland international footballers
Ekstraklasa players
I liga players
English Football League players
Legia Warsaw players
Wolverhampton Wanderers F.C. players
Charlton Athletic F.C. players
Pogoń Szczecin players
Korona Kielce players
Piast Gliwice players
Jagiellonia Białystok players
Wisła Kraków players
Polish expatriate footballers
Expatriate footballers in England
Polish expatriate sportspeople in England